Great Eight may refer to:

 The Great Eight (Cincinnati Reds), the starting lineup for the 1975 Cincinnati Reds
 Eight Great Lingpas, important figures in the Nyingma lineage of Tibetan Buddhism
 The Great Eight (book), a 2009 book by Olympian figure skater Scott Hamilton
 A nickname for Russian ice hockey player Alexander Ovechkin
 A nickname for the Théâtre National de Bretagne, in Rennes, France

See also